Ajoy Das (born 5 March 1976) is an Indian former cricketer. He played 22 first-class matches for Bengal between 1996 and 2001.

See also
 List of Bengal cricketers

References

External links
 

1976 births
Living people
Indian cricketers
Bengal cricketers